= Jhuluri railway station =

Railway station in Pakistan

Coordinates: 25.429411°N 69.1545°E

Jhuluri railway station جهلوري ريلوي اسٽيشن

General information
- Owner: Ministry of Railways

Other information
- Station code: JLE

History
- Former names: Great Indian Peninsula Railway
Location

Jhuluri railway station (Urdu: جھلوری ریلوے اسٹیشن, Sindhi: جهلوري ريلوي اسٽيشن) is located in Pakistan.

It is a narrow gauge Railway Station located on a loop line. During its operation it had 16 shuttle train running on it. It is now abandoned.

It was abandoned in either 2005 or 2007.

== See also ==
- List of railway stations in Pakistan
- Pakistan Railways
